Las Vegas City Hall is the center of municipal government for the City of Las Vegas, Nevada. It is located downtown, with its main entrance on Main Street.

History
This building replaced the former building which had been used since 1973.  Built by Forest City Enterprises, the highly-sustainable building features several environmentally friendly features, such as 33 energy producing  solar trees as well as rooftop solar panels that reduce energy costs.  A programmable LED light display on the front facade can display various patterns at night.

References

Buildings and structures in Las Vegas
City halls in Nevada
Downtown Las Vegas
Government buildings completed in 2012